Endless Bummer may refer to:

 "Endless Bummer", a 2008 album by Sloppy Seconds
 Endless Bummer, a 2009 American comedy film directed by Sam Pillsbury
 "Endless Bummer", a 1999 episode of season 2 of Johnny Bravo
 "Endless Bummer", a 2007 episode of season 2 of Tom and Jerry Tales
 "Endless Bummer", a 2016 song by Weezer from Weezer (White Album)